Mirvetuximab soravtansine, sold under the brand name Elahere, is a medication used as a treatment for fallopian tube cancer or primary peritoneal cancer. Mirvetuximab soravtansine is a folate receptor alpha directed antibody and microtubule inhibitor conjugate.

The most common adverse reactions, including laboratory abnormalities, were vision impairment, fatigue, increased aspartate aminotransferase, nausea, increased alanine aminotransferase, keratopathy, abdominal pain, decreased lymphocytes, peripheral neuropathy, diarrhea, decreased albumin, constipation, increased alkaline phosphatase, dry eye, decreased magnesium, decreased leukocytes, decreased neutrophils, and decreased hemoglobin.

Mirvetuximab soravtansine was approved for medical use in the United States in November 2022. The US Food and Drug Administration (FDA) considers it to be a first-in-class medication.

Medical uses 
Mirvetuximab soravtansine is indicated for the treatment of adults with folate receptor alpha (FRα) positive, platinum-resistant epithelial ovarian, fallopian tube, or primary peritoneal cancer, who have received one to three prior systemic treatment regimens. Recipients are selected for therapy based on an FDA-approved test.

Adverse effects 
The product labeling includes a boxed warning for ocular toxicity.

History 
Efficacy was evaluated in Study 0417 (NCT04296890), a single-arm trial of 106 participants with FRα positive, platinum-resistant epithelial ovarian, fallopian tube, or primary peritoneal cancer. Participants were permitted to receive up to three prior lines of systemic therapy. All participants were required to have received bevacizumab. The trial enrolled participants whose tumors were positive for FRα expression as determined by the above assay. Participants were excluded if they had corneal disorders, ocular conditions requiring ongoing treatment, Grade >1 peripheral neuropathy, or noninfectious interstitial lung disease.

Society and culture

Names 
Mirvetuximab soravtansine is the international nonproprietary name (INN).

References

External links 
 
 

Monoclonal antibodies for tumors
Antibody-drug conjugates